Thomas Johnson (1942 – 23 February 2011) was a South African soccer player and manager.

He was one of the co-founders of Kaizer Chiefs,  the club's first captain and the first head coach of the Kaizer Chiefs team. He also competed in the first ever Soweto derby on 24 January 1970, only 17 days after Chiefs' formation.

Coaching career
Johnson had coaching licenses from Germany, England and Brazil. Johnson attended a coaching courses in Germany and came back with videos to pass on his knowledge to other players. Whilst head coach of Kaizer Chiefs, he won South Africa's national cup competition three times. He was the technical director of Dona's Mates Youth Academy in Orange Farm.

Personal life
He is survived by his wife, Dimakatso, eight children, seven grandchildren and on one great grand child.

Death
Johnson died from prostate cancer in February 2011. He was buried in Soweto.

References 

South African soccer players
South African soccer managers
Orlando Pirates F.C. players
Kaizer Chiefs F.C. players
Expatriate football managers in Botswana
Botswana national football team managers
South African expatriates in Botswana
1942 births
2011 deaths
Kaizer Chiefs F.C. managers
Association footballers not categorized by position